Chun Mee (pronounced ) is a popular green tea. It has a dusty appearance and is generally more acidic and less sweet than other green teas. It was originally produced only in the Chinese Jiangxi province, but is nowadays also grown elsewhere. The tea is divided into several grades with numbers. Some examples are: 41022, 4011, 9371, 8147, 9367, 9366, 3008 or 3009. The number 41022 in this case represents the highest quality, while number 8147 practically only consists of broken leaves.

Chun mee tea, together with Assam Bukial tea, has been studied to observe the rate of infusion of caffeine.  The study found that caffeine diffusion through the tea leaves is a greatly hindered process.

See also
 Green tea
 List of Chinese teas

References 

Green tea
Chinese teas
Chinese tea grown in Anhui